The Hammond Covered Bridge is a Town lattice covered bridge spanning Otter Creek in Pittsford, Vermont. The bridge was built in 1842 by Asa Norse, and originally carried Kendall Hill Road, which now passes just to its south.  The bridge was added to the National Register of Historic Places on January 21, 1974.

Description and history
The Hammond Covered Bridge is located north of the Pittsford Village center, just north of Kendall Hill Road, a secondary street providing access from United States Route 7 to points on the west side of Otter Creek. The bridge spans the creek in an east-west orientation. The eastern abutment is built of stone and marble slabs, and is now topped by a concrete pad, while the western abutment is marble topped by concrete. The bridge has been reinforced with laminated beams mounted below the trusses. The exterior is finished in vertical board siding, which extends around to the portal faces and a short way inside. There are square openings providing light to the interior of the structure, which is capped by a corrugated metal roof.

The bridge was built in 1842 by Asa Nourse. Since it was still functional, the bridge was placed on barrels and transported back to its original location; it is now called "the bridge that went on a voyage". The bridge was later bypassed by a steel and concrete bridge on Kendall Hill Road and is closed to vehicle traffic. It was acquired by the state in 1961, which is responsible for its maintenance.

See also
National Register of Historic Places listings in Rutland County, Vermont
List of Vermont covered bridges
List of bridges on the National Register of Historic Places in Vermont

References

Covered bridges on the National Register of Historic Places in Vermont
Bridges completed in 1842
Buildings and structures in Pittsford, Vermont
Covered bridges in Rutland County, Vermont
National Register of Historic Places in Rutland County, Vermont
Road bridges on the National Register of Historic Places in Vermont
1842 establishments in Vermont
Wooden bridges in Vermont
Lattice truss bridges in the United States